I Spy was a Canadian hardcore punk band founded in Regina, Saskatchewan, in 1991, relocated to  Winnipeg, Manitoba, in 1994, and disbanded in 1996. Combining childish humour and politically oriented emotive hardcore, the group released several records on Recess Records and toured internationally. Front man Todd Kowalski later joined Propagandhi.

History

Career
Originally called Clump (alternately Klump), the band was composed of lead singer and guitarist Todd Kowalski ("Todd the Rod"), lead guitarist Jeromy Van Dusen ("Rary"), bass guitarist Juan David Guerrero ("Guido" or "Olive") and drummer James Ash ("Jimmy Juice Pig"). With a blend of childish humour and serious, radical left wing political subject matter, the band garnered a following in the Canadian punk rock scene behind several releases on Recess Records and extensive touring.

In 1994, the band released a split 10" record, I'd Rather Be Flag-Burning, with fellow Winnipeg band Propagandhi, and the two bands toured together throughout western Canada that year. Later in 1994, the band toured independently throughout the Midwestern United States. In 1995, they toured the western United States, western Canada and Europe. Van Dusen left the band in 1995 after the band's European tour, reducing them to a three-piece in their latter days. The final line-up had bass guitarist Sean Talarico replacing Guerrero, who moved back to Regina.

Post-breakup
G7 Welcoming Committee Records released the band's complete discography on a single CD, Perversity Is Spreading... It's About Time!. This packaged all of their released material with bonus tracks, including cover versions of songs by Diana Ross and Youth of Today. Kowalski joined Propagandhi in 1997 after the departure of bass guitarist John K. Samson, who left to form The Weakerthans. Propagandhi's 2001 album. Today's Empires, Tomorrow's Ashes. includes their version of an unreleased I Spy song, "Fuck the Border".  Kowalski also played in the grindcore band Swallowing Shit.

In 2002, the original four members reunited in Propagandhi singer Chris Hannah's basement studio to re-record their version of Diana Ross's "When We Grow Up" for the Somebody Needs a Timeout compilation album released by Campfire Records.

Band members
Todd Kowalski – vocals, guitar (1991–1996)
James Ash  – drums, vocals (1991–1996)
Juan David Guerrero  – bass guitar (1991–1995)
Jeromy Van Dusen  – guitar (1991–1995)
Sean Talarico  – bass guitar (1995–1996)

Discography
Four-song demo cassette (1993: self-released)
I'd Rather Be Flag-Burning (1994: split 10"/CD with Propagandhi, Recess Records)
Revenge of the Little Shits (1995: 10"/CD, Recess Records)
Split 7" with ...But Alive (1995: 7")
Perversity Is Spreading... It's About Time! (1998: complete discography, CD/LP, G7 Welcoming Committee Records)
I Spy has also contributed songs to numerous compilation albums.

References

External links
 I Spy profile at G7 Welcoming Committee Records
 I Spy at Allmusic

Musical groups established in 1991
Musical groups disestablished in 1996
Musical groups from Regina, Saskatchewan
Canadian hardcore punk groups
Anarcho-punk groups
G7 Welcoming Committee Records artists
1991 establishments in Saskatchewan
1996 disestablishments in Canada